Robert Morris Yardley (October 9, 1850 – December 8, 1902) was a Republican member of the U.S. House of Representatives from Pennsylvania.

Robert M. Yardley was born in Yardley, Pennsylvania. He attended public and private schools in Yardley and Doylestown, Pennsylvania.  He studied law, was admitted to the bar in 1872 and commenced practice in Doylestown.  He served as district attorney of Bucks County, Pennsylvania from 1880 to 1884. He was a delegate to the 1884 Republican National Convention.

Yardley was elected as a Republican to the Fiftieth and Fifty-first Congresses. He served as chairman of the United States House Committee on Expenditures in the Department of War during the Fifty-first Congress. He declined to be a candidate for renomination in 1890.

He resumed the practice of law in Bucks County.  He served as a member of the Doylestown School Board and as the director of several financial and public service corporations.

He died in Doylestown, aged 52, and is buried in Doylestown Cemetery.

Sources

1850 births
1902 deaths
County district attorneys in Pennsylvania
Pennsylvania lawyers
People from Yardley, Pennsylvania
Republican Party members of the United States House of Representatives from Pennsylvania
School board members in Pennsylvania
19th-century American politicians
Burials in Pennsylvania